The Union of Baptist Churches in the Netherlands is a Baptist Christian denomination in the Netherlands. It is affiliated with the Baptist World Alliance. The headquarters is in Amsterdam.

History
The Union of Baptist Churches in the Netherlands has its origins in the founding of the first Baptist church in Amsterdam, by the English pastor John Smyth in 1609, thus marking the beginning of the Baptist movement.  However, it was a mission of the Danish Julius Köbner in 1845 that allowed the establishment of several churches in the country. It was officially founded by seven congregations in 1881. According to a denomination census released in 2020, it claimed 82 churches and 9,695 members.

See also
 Born again
 Baptist beliefs
 Believers' Church

References

External links
 Official Website

Baptist denominations in Europe
Evangelicalism in the Netherlands
Christian denominations in the Netherlands
Religious organizations established in 1881
1881 establishments in the Netherlands